Heteropsis decira is a butterfly in the family Nymphalidae. It is found in Ghana.

References

Elymniini
Butterflies described in 1880
Endemic fauna of Ghana
Butterflies of Africa